Rodolfo Sergio Rodríguez Rodríguez (born January 20, 1956 in Montevideo) is a Uruguayan former professional footballer who played as a goalkeeper. He was once the most capped player in the history of the Uruguay national team with 78 international appearances between 1976 and 1986.

His youth player career began at Cerro in 1971, but he moved to Nacional in 1976.

At Nacional, Rodríguez started his professional career in 1976. He played with the team until 1984, having won the Uruguayan Championship in 1977, 1980 and 1983, the Copa Libertadores in 1980 and the Copa Intercontinental also in 1980.

In 1984, he joined Santos in Brazil. At Santos he won the São Paulo State Championship in 1984. He stayed with the club until 1987.

Rodríguez then moved to Sporting Clube de Portugal but only stayed there for one season (1988–1989). He returned to Brazil in 1990 to play at Portuguesa. Two years later he left Portuguesa to join Bahia with which he won two Bahia State Championships in 1993 and 1994.

As goalkeeper for the Uruguay national team, Rodolfo Rodríguez won the 50th anniversary tournament of the first World Cup, the 1980 Mundialito, and the Copa América in 1983,. He also took part with the national squads that played in the 1979 Copa América, and the 1986 FIFA World Cup.

He retired in 1994 as the most capped Uruguayan player ever, having played 78 officially recognised games for his national side.

External links
International statistics at rsssf
 Profile at Tenfield
 Sitedalusa.com Sita de Lusa article

References

1956 births
Living people
Footballers from Montevideo
Association football goalkeepers
Uruguayan footballers
Uruguayan expatriate footballers
Uruguayan Primera División players
Primeira Liga players
C.A. Cerro players
Club Nacional de Football players
Santos FC players
Sporting CP footballers
Associação Portuguesa de Desportos players
Esporte Clube Bahia players
Uruguay international footballers
Uruguayan beach soccer players
1979 Copa América players
1983 Copa América players
1986 FIFA World Cup players
Expatriate footballers in Brazil
Expatriate footballers in Portugal
Uruguayan expatriate sportspeople in Portugal
Uruguayan football managers
San Martín de San Juan managers